Beata may refer to:

People
 Beata, the feminine form of the Latin (and Italian) title given to people who have been beatified
 Beata (and Beate), woman's given name; including list of people with the name
 Mario Beata (born 1974), Honduran retired soccer player

Places
 Beata Island (Isla Beata), in Dominican Republic
 Cabo Beata, southernmost point of the island of Hispaniola, in the Dominican Republic

Other uses
 Beata (spider), a genus of jumping spiders
 La Beata, a 1909 Argentine film

See also

Beat (disambiguation)